Ribulose 1,5-bisphosphate (RuBP) is an organic substance that is involved in photosynthesis, notably as the principal  acceptor in plants. It is a colourless anion, a double phosphate ester of the ketopentose (ketone-containing sugar with five carbon atoms) called ribulose. Salts of RuBP can be isolated, but its crucial biological function happens in solution. RuBP occurs not only in plants but in all domains of life, including Archaea, Bacteria, and Eukarya.

History
RuBP was originally discovered by Andrew Benson in 1951 while working in the lab of Melvin Calvin at UC Berkeley. Calvin, who had been away from the lab at the time of discovery and was not listed as a co-author, controversially removed the full molecule name from the title of the initial paper, identifying it solely as "ribulose". At the time, the molecule was known as ribulose diphosphate (RDP or RuDP) but the prefix di- was changed to bis- to emphasize the nonadjacency of the two phosphate groups.

Role in photosynthesis and the Calvin-Benson Cycle

The enzyme ribulose-1,5-bisphosphate carboxylase-oxygenase (rubisco) catalyzes the reaction between RuBP and carbon dioxide. The product is the highly unstable six-carbon intermediate known as 3-keto-2-carboxyarabinitol 1,5-bisphosphate, or 2'-carboxy-3-keto-D-arabinitol 1,5-bisphosphate (CKABP). This six-carbon β-ketoacid intermediate hydrates into another six-carbon intermediate in the form of a gem-diol. This intermediate then cleaves into two molecules of 3-phosphoglycerate (3-PGA) which is used in a number of metabolic pathways and is converted into glucose.

In the Calvin-Benson cycle, RuBP is a product of the phosphorylation of ribulose-5-phosphate (produced by glyceraldehyde 3-phosphate) by ATP.

Interactions with rubisco
RuBP acts as an enzyme inhibitor for the enzyme rubisco, which regulates the net activity of carbon fixation. The functionality of rubisco activase involves removing RuBP and other inhibitory bonded molecules to re-enable carbamylation on the active site.

Role in photorespiration

Rubisco also catalyzes RuBP with oxygen in an interaction called photorespiration, a process that is more prevalent at high temperatures. Like the Calvin-Benson Cycle, the photorespiratory pathway has been noted for its enzymatic inefficiency although this characterization of the enzymatic kinetics of rubisco have been contested. Similarly, photorespiration is limited in CAM photosynthesis due to kinetic delays in enzyme activation, again stemming from the ratio of carbon dioxide to oxygen.

Measurement
G3P can then be measured using an enzymatic optical assay. Given the abundance of RuBP in biological samples, an added difficulty is distinguishing particular reservoirs of the substrate, such as the RuBP internal to a chloroplast vs external. One approach to resolving this is by subtractive inference, or measuring the total RuBP of a system, removing a reservoir (e.g. by centrifugation), re-measuring the total RuBP, and using the difference to infer the concentration in the given repository.

See also
 Rubisco
 Calvin-Benson cycle
 3-Phosphoglyceric acid
 Photosynthesis

References

Photosynthesis
Organophosphates
Monosaccharide derivatives